Büyükköy is a town (belde) in the Çayeli District, Rize Province, Turkey. Its population is 2,438 (2021).

References

Populated places in Çayeli District